Edward J. "Chip" Clancy Jr. (June 30, 1950 - June 6, 2021) was a Massachusetts politician who served the 55th mayor of Lynn, Massachusetts. He was first elected in November 2001. Previously, Clancy served on the Lynn City Council. After the council, he served in the Massachusetts House of Representatives and the Massachusetts Senate.  In 2001, while still a member of the Massachusetts Senate, Clancy was elected as Mayor of Lynn; after his election as Mayor, Clancy resigned from the Senate. On November 3, 2009 he was defeated by Republican challenger Judith Flanagan Kennedy, by a margin of 27 votes.  Clancy continued to practice law and remained active in the community.  Clancy died on June 6, 2021 of natural causes at the age of 70, with his wife Linda and family by his side.

Early life
Clancy is a native of Lynn, Massachusetts.  Clancy's parents were Mrs. Claire M. (Luby) Clancy and Edward J. "Nipper" Clancy, a former political leader and city assessor of Lynn.

Early career
Clancy graduated from Providence College and Suffolk University Law School.  On December 15, 1975 Clancy was admitted to the Massachusetts Bar and served as an Assistant Attorney General in the Massachusetts Attorney General's office.

Lynn City Council
In 1977, Clancy was elected to the Lynn, Massachusetts, city council.

First run for Mayor
In 1981 Clancy lost his first campaign for Mayor of Lynn. In the 1981 preliminary election Clancy finished first, receiving 1,393 more votes than incumbent Mayor Antonio J. Marino. However, Mayor Marino defeated Clancy by 3,119 votes in the final election.

Return to the City Council
In 1983 Clancy was once again elected to the Lynn City Council as a City Councilor at large.

Election to the Massachusetts House of Representatives
In 1990 Clancy ran in the Democratic Primary for the Massachusetts House of Representatives.  Clancy ran against former Speaker of the House Thomas W. McGee.  Initially McGee was declared the winner with a nine-vote victory. However, after a recount Clancy was ahead of McGee by a five-vote margin. After McGee challenged the recount in court, Clancy ended up winning the primary by an 11-vote margin.  Clancy went on to defeat Republican Kimberly P. Simone and win the general election in November 1990.

Election to the Massachusetts Senate
In April 1994 Massachusetts State Senator Walter J. Boverini (D-Lynn) announced that he would not run for reelection the State Senate. Clancy ran for and won the Democratic Party's nomination for the seat being vacated by Boverini.

In November 1994 Clancy won the general election for State Senate seat from the 1st Essex District.

Clancy garnered 29,637 votes or 55% of the vote vs Republican Kathleen E. Caron's 24,663 votes or 45% of the total votes cast.

Election as Mayor of Lynn
Clancy ran unopposed in his first two elections for the Mayor of Lynn. On November 3, 2009, Clancy was defeated by Judith Flanagan Kennedy by a total of 8,043 votes to 8,016.

Election history

2009 Lynn Mayoral Election

Source: Our Campaigns

Source: Boston Globe Lynn Item

References

External links
Mayors of the City of Lynn since its incorporation in 1850 from the official website of the City of Lynn
Mayor Clancy's official Biography from the City of Lynn website
Mayor Clancy's record from the Massachusetts Board of Bar Overseers website

Mayors of Lynn, Massachusetts
Living people
Democratic Party members of the Massachusetts House of Representatives
Democratic Party Massachusetts state senators
Massachusetts city council members
Suffolk University Law School alumni
1950 births